Democratic Movement of Kyrgyzstan is a political party active in Kyrgyzstan. The party's Chairman is Jypar Jeksheev (Jypar Jekshe), who is also the founder of the movement. The party was founded on June 27, 1993 with Jeksheev as chairman until 2000, when he was succeeded by Edilbek Sarybaev.

In 2000 the movement joined with the supporters of the barred Ar-Namys (Dignity) Party of former Prime Minister Felix Kulov to form an electoral alliance to contest the parliamentary elections. The alliance collapsed when the Ar-Namys Party was registered.

The party's platform calls for democratic social development and formation of a politically and economically competent personality. In 2004 the movement joined the People's Movement of Kyrgyzstan electoral alliance.

Historical background
Initially there was an opposition umbrella bloc, called the Kyrgyzstan Democratic Movement (Kyrgyzstan Demokratiyalyk Kyimyly, KDK). It was established on 25–26 May 1990 as a bloc of several anti-Communist political parties, movements and nongovernment organizations in Kyrgyzstan. The bloc elected five co-chairmen:  Dr. Topchubek Turgunally (Turgunaliev), Kazat Akmatov (a Kyrgyz writer, then lawmaker), Jypar Jekshe (one of the leaders of Ashar movement), Tolon Dyikanbaev and Kadyr Matkaziev (leader of the Asaba Party).

The draft of the program of the KDK was prepared by Dr. Kamilya Kenenbayeva (Women Pedagogy Institute in Bishkek, now the Pedagogy University named after Ishenally Arabayev), and the draft regulations of the movement was prepared by Dr. Tyntchtykbek Tchoroev (Kyrgyz State University, now the Kyrgyz National University). The movement consisted of democracy-minded intellectuals, workers, and students from  ethnic groups (Kyrgyz, Russian, Ukrainian, German, Jew, Uzbek, Dungan, etc.)

The movement was dispersed into several political parties after the collapse of the Soviet Union and emergence of the independent Kyrgyz Republic. It took a few years (1991–1993) and one of its groups emerged as the Party of the Democratic Movement of Kyrgyzstan (June 1993).

References
 T. Chorotegin, K. Moldokasymov: Kyrgyzdardyn jana Kyrgyzstandyn kyskacha taryhy, Bishkek, 2000 (in Kyrgyz);
 T. Chorotegin, K. Moldokasymov: Istoriya Kyrgyzstana; in: Kyrgyzstan: Entsiklopediya, Bishkek, 2001 (in the separate Kyrgyz and Russian editions);
 Haghayeghi, Mehrdad. Islam and Politics in Central Asia.  New York, 1995.  - .

External links
http://www.rferl.org/content/off_mic_kyrgyz_may_day_protest/2035589.html

Political parties in Kyrgyzstan